Henry of Schweinfurt (de Suinvorde;  – 18 September 1017) was the Margrave of the Nordgau from 994 until 1004. He was called the "glory of eastern Franconia" by his own cousin, the chronicler Thietmar of Merseburg.

Henry was the son of Berthold and Eilika (Eiliswintha or Eila) of Walbeck. His father's parentage is not known with certainty, but he may have been a son of Arnulf, Duke of Bavaria. Henry was Bavarian, whoever his grandfather.

Henry held a succession of countships after his father's death in 980. He was appointed marchio, like his father, of the Bavarian Nordgau in 994. In 1003, he revolted against Henry II of Germany claiming that he had been promised the Duchy of Bavaria in return for his support. The king said that the Bavarians had a right to elect their own duke. Henry allied with Boleslaus I of Poland and Boleslaus III of Bohemia. Nevertheless, his rebellion was quashed and he himself was briefly captive. The king established the Diocese of Bamberg to prevent any further uprisings in the region. The new diocese took over the secular authority of the margrave in the region of the Bavarian Nordgau.

Finally, it was only the joint persuasion of both his saecular and ecclesiastical overlords, Bernard I, Duke of Saxony, and Tagino, Archbishop of Magdeburg, that reconciled him to Henry in 1004. Henry of Schweinfurt did subsequently gain new and old countships before his death in 1017. He was buried at Schweinfurt.

Family
Henry married Gerberga of Gleiberg, daughter of Herbert of Wetterau. They had three sons and two daughters:
Otto, who later became Duke of Swabia
Eilika or Eilica, married Bernard II, Duke of Saxony
Judith of Schweinfurt (died 2 August 1058), married Bretislaus I of Bohemia
Burchard I, Bishop of Halberstadt, chancellor of the Emperor Conrad II
Henry, a count in the Nordgau

References

Sources
Reuter, Timothy. Germany in the Early Middle Ages 800–1056. New York: Longman, 1991.

Margraves of Germany
Bavarian nobility
970s births
1017 deaths
Year of birth uncertain
11th-century German nobility